Leap Castle is a castle in Coolderry, County Offaly, Ireland, about  north of the town of Roscrea and  south of Kinnitty on the R421.

History 
There are varied accounts as to when exactly the main tower/keep was constructed, ranging anywhere from the 13th century to the late 15th century, but most likely around 1250 AD. It was built by the O'Bannon clan and was originally called "Léim Uí Bhanáin" (as was the fertile land around the castle which was associated with the Bannon clan) or "Leap of the O'Bannons". The O'Bannons were the "secondary chieftains" of the territory and were subject to the ruling O'Carroll clan. There is evidence that it was constructed on the same site as another ancient stone structure, perhaps ceremonial in nature, and that that area has been occupied consistently since at least the Iron Age (500 BCE) and possibly since Neolithic times.

The Annals of the Four Masters record that the Earl of Kildare, Gerald FitzGerald, tried unsuccessfully to seize the castle in 1513. Three years later, he attacked the castle again and managed to partially demolish sections of it. However, by 1557, the O'Carrolls had regained possession.

Following the death of Mulrooney O'Carroll in 1532, family struggles plagued the O'Carroll clan. A fierce rivalry for leadership erupted within the family. The bitter fight for power turned brother against brother. One of the brothers was a priest. While he was holding mass for a group of his family (in what is now called the "Bloody Chapel"), his rival brother burst into the chapel, plunged his sword into him and fatally wounded him. The butchered priest fell across the altar and died in front of his family.

In 1659, the castle passed by marriage into the ownership of the Darby family, notable members of whom included Vice-Admiral George Darby, Admiral Sir Henry D'Esterre Darby and John Nelson Darby. During the tenure of one Jonathan Charles Darby, séances were held in the castle by his wife Mildred Darby, who was a writer of Gothic novels: this led to publicity about the castle and its ghosts. The central keep was later expanded with significant extensions, but in order to pay for these, rents were raised, and much of the land accompanying the castle was sold. This is one theorised motivation for the burning of the castle during the Irish Civil War in 1922. After its destruction, Mr. Darby obtained a reinstatement estimate from Beckett & Medcalf, surveyors in Dublin, that was issued in September 1922. Confusingly, it gives the address as Leap Castle, Roscrea, Co. Tipperary. The net "Amount of Claim" was £22,684.19.1, equivalent to about €1m in 2018. The claim was settled for a lesser amount.

In 1974 the now ruined castle was bought by Australian historian Peter Bartlett, whose mother had been a Banon. Bartlett, together with builder Joe Sullivan, carried out extensive restoration work on the castle up to the time of his death in 1989. Since 1991, the castle has been privately owned by the musician Sean Ryan and his wife Anne, who continue the restoration work.

In popular culture
The castle has been visited by paranormal investigators from ABC Family's Scariest Places on Earth and Living TV's Most Haunted in its first season, as well as The Atlantic Paranormal Society (TAPS) from Syfy's Ghost Hunters. In August 2014, Travel Channel's Ghost Adventures filmed their tenth season Halloween special at the castle, and most recently by paranormal investigation Youtube channel Sam and Colby. The claims of paranormal activity include the putative existence of a  Red Lady ghost, the ghosts of two girls, and an "elemental spirit" associated with Mildred Darby.  The castle describes itself as "the world's most haunted castle".

This castle was featured on the cover of several editions of the novel The Riders by Tim Winton.

In 1996, Leap Castle's history and hauntings were examined in Castle Ghosts of Ireland by Robert Hardy.

A chapter in "The World of Lore: Dreadful Places" by Aaaron Mahnke is also dedicated to Leap Castle. It is titled The Tainted Well in reference to the castle's gruesome oubliette. The castle is also featured in his podcast Lore, Episode 68: The Tainted Well.

References

External links
Simon Marsden
Castles.org
Haunted Britain
Irish Culture and Customs (Last listing)
Description, history and pictures of Leap Castle

Castles in County Offaly
Reportedly haunted locations in Ireland